Thermal velocity or thermal speed is a typical velocity of the thermal motion of particles that make up a gas, liquid, etc. Thus, indirectly, thermal velocity is a measure of temperature. Technically speaking, it is a measure of the width of the peak in the Maxwell–Boltzmann particle velocity distribution. Note that in the strictest sense thermal velocity is not a velocity, since velocity usually describes a vector rather than simply a scalar speed.

Since the thermal velocity is only a "typical" velocity, a number of different definitions can be and are used.

Taking  to be the Boltzmann constant,  the absolute temperature, and  the mass of a particle, we can write the different thermal velocities:

In one dimension 

If  is defined as the root mean square of the velocity in any one dimension (i.e. any single direction), then

 

If  is defined as the mean of the magnitude of the velocity in any one dimension (i.e. any single direction), then

In three dimensions 

If  is defined as the most probable speed, then

 

If  is defined as the root mean square of the total velocity, then

 

If  is defined as the mean of the magnitude of the velocity of the atoms or molecules, then

 

All of these definitions are in the range

Thermal velocity at room temperature

At 20 °C (293.15 kelvins), the mean  thermal velocity of common gasses in three dimensions is:

References

Thermodynamic properties
Statistical mechanics